Nepal is a country where the industrial growth is limited, making land the most economic asset.  However, obtaining land in Nepal is far from easy. During the period of colonization, land in Nepal was more abundant and people could obtain large amounts of land . As time passed, the frontier land became occupied, which placed a higher price on scarce land.

In recent years, there has been a steady pattern of migration in Nepal from the hill and mountain regions to the Terai. The Terai is a fertile agricultural area along the southern border of Nepal.  The 1981 Nepalese census indicated a pronounced shift from a mountain-rural to a plains-urban society (Goldstein; Ross; Schuler).  Authors Hrabvoszky and Miyan call this change “The Great Turnabout”.

The population in the mountain regions of Nepal has exceeded the carrying capacity of the land.  Therefore, people are moving to the more arable lands of the Terai.  It is estimated that 60% of Nepal’s population is concentrated in the hill and mountain regions, while 60% of farmland is in the Terai.  The migrants hope to make a better life for themselves by moving to the agricultural hub of the country.  However, these migrants are having difficulty finding affordable land.

“The Great Turnabout” is causing a great deal of tension in the Terai.  The region is experiencing ethnic tension between the plains and hill people.  Furthermore, deforestation in the Terai is drastically reducing the country’s timber resources, and is also increasing soil erosion and flooding (Weiner).  Finally, political leaders in Nepal feel the hill and mountain regions represent the cultural heartland of the country and they do not want to see these areas abandoned for the Terai.

Migrants 
Migrants are those peoples who are shifting from one place to another for something they are wishing. In Nepal, mainly people are migrating from undeveloped(rural) to developed(urban) areas. Migration maybe temporary or permanent. Rural population is way more less than urban population creating huge differences. Migrants are soul for that particular areas. People migrate due to pull and push factors.

Types of Migration 

 Internal and International
 Temporary and Permanent
 Rural and Urban
 Legal and Illegal
 Volunteer and Forced

Types of Internal Migration 

 Inter-district migration
 inter-province migration

REFERENCES 

Society of Nepal